The Mountain Valley News was a weekly newspaper published on Wednesdays based in Cedaredge, Colorado covering Delta County, Colorado, United States.

References

Defunct newspapers published in Colorado
Delta County, Colorado